The Ministry of Home Affairs, abbreviated KDN, MOHA, is a ministry of the Government of Malaysia that is responsible for home affairs: law enforcement, public security, public order,   population registry, immigration, foreign workers, management of societies, anti-drug, publication / printing / distribution of printed materials, film control, management of volunteer, rehabilitation and implementation of punishment.

The Minister of Home Affairs administers his functions through the Ministry of Home Affairs and a range of other government agencies. The current Minister of Home Affairs is Saifuddin Nasution Ismail, whose term start from 3 December 2022.

Its headquarters is in Putrajaya.

Organisation
 Minister of Home Affairs
 Deputy Minister
 Second Deputy Minister
 Secretary-General
 Under the Authority of Secretary-General
 Legal Advisor Office
 Internal Audit Division
 Strategic Planning Division
 Corporate Communication Division
 Integrity Unit
 Deputy Secretary-General (Policy and Enforcement)
 Immigration Affairs Division
 National Registration and Societies Division
 Foreign Worker Management Division
 Institute of Public Security of Malaysia 
 The Council for Anti-Trafficking in Persons and Anti-Smuggling of Migrants through National Strategic Office to the Council (NSO MAPO) Division
 International Relations Division
 Deputy Secretary-General (Security)
 Film Censorship Control and Enforcement Division
 Publication and Quranic Texts Control Division
 Security and Public Order Division
Prisons, Anti-Drug and Civil Defence Division
 National Key Results Area Division
 Police and Border Security Division
 Parole Board Secretariat
 Prevention of Crime Board Secretariat
 Prevention of Terrorism Board Secretariat
 Deputy Secretary-General (Management)
 Senior Under-Secretary (Management)
 Human Resources Management Division
 Information Management Division
 Management Services and Asset Division
 Parliament and Cabinet Division
 Police Force Commission Secretariat
 Senior Under-Secretary (Development and Procurement)
 Finance Division
 Account Division
 Procurement Division
 Development Division

Federal departments
 Royal Malaysia Police (RMP), or Polis Diraja Malaysia (PDRM). (Official site)
 Malaysian Maritime Enforcement Agency (MMEA) or "Agensi Penguatkuasaan Maritim Malaysia" (APMM)
 Malaysian Prison Department (PRIDE), or Jabatan Penjara Malaysia. (Official site)
 Immigration Department of Malaysia, or Jabatan Imigresen Malaysia (JIM). (Official site)
 National Registration Department of Malaysia, or Jabatan Pendaftaran Negara Malaysia (JPN). (Official site)
 The Registry of Societies Malaysia (ROS), or Jabatan Pendaftar Pertubuhan Malaysia (JPPM). (Official site)
Malaysia Border Security Agency or "Agensi Kawalan Sempadan" (AKSEM)
 The People's Volunteer Corps, or Jabatan Sukarelawan Malaysia (RELA). (Official site)

Federal agencies
 National Anti-Drug Agency, or Agensi Antidadah Kebangsaan (AADK). (Official site)
Institute of Public Security of Malaysia (IPSOM) or Institut Keselamatan Awam Malaysia
 Council for Anti-Trafficking in Persons and Anti-Smuggling of Migrants, or Majlis Antipemerdagangan Orang dan Antipenyeludupan Migran (MAPO). 
 Prevention of Crime Board, or Lembaga Pencegahan Jenayah. 
 Parole Board, or Lembaga Parol.
 Film Censorship Board, or Lembaga Penapis Filem. (Official site)
 Prevention of Terrorism Board, or Lembaga Pencegahan Keganasan.
 National Printing Malaysian Limited, or Percetakan Nasional Malaysia Berhad (PNMB). (Official site)

Key legislation
The Ministry of Home Affairs is responsible for administration of several key Acts:
 Registration of Criminals and Undesirable Persons Act 1969 [Act 7]
 Sedition Act 1948 [Act 15]
 National Registration Act 1959 [Act 78]
 Official Secrets Act 1972 [Act 88]
 Passports Act 1966 [Act 150]
 Registration of Births and Deaths (Special Provisions) Act 1975 [Act 152]
 Immigration Act 1959/63 [Act 155]
 Law Reform (Marriage and Divorce) Act 1976 [Act 164]
 Explosives Act 1957 [Act 207]
 Registration of Adoptions Act 1952 [Act 253]
 Prevention of Crime Act 1959 [Act 297]
 Protected Areas and Protected Places Act 1959 [Act 298]
 Births and Deaths Registration Act 1957 [Act 299]
 Printing Presses and Publications Act 1984 [Act 301]
 National Defence Fund (Dissolution and Transfer) Act 1984 [Act 305]
 Dangerous Drugs (Special Preventive Measures) Act 1985 [Act 316]
 Printing of Qur'anic Texts Act 1986 [Act 326]
 Societies Act 1966 [Act 335]
 Police Act 1967 [Act 344]
 Criminal Justice Act 1953 [Act 345]
 Registration of Guests Act 1965 [Act 381]
 Prison Act 1995 [Act 537]
 Criminal Procedure Code [Act 593]
 Film Censorship Act 2002 [Act 620]
 National Anti Drugs Agency Act 2004 [Act 638]
 Peaceful Assembly Act 2012 [Act 736]
 Security Offences (Special Measures) Act 2012 [Act 747]
 Malaysia Volunteers Corps Act 2012 [Act 752]
 Prevention of Terrorism Act 2015 [Act 769]
 Special Measures Against Terrorism in Foreign Countries Act 2015 [Act 770]

Policy Priorities of the Government of the Day
 National Home Affairs Policy

Functions of the ministry
The functions of the ministry can be categorised into the following 12 key areas:

Security and Public Order
Maritime Security
Registration
Immigration and Foreign Workers
Management of Societies
Border security
Anti-Drugs
Publication and Qur'anic Text Control
Film Control
Management of Volunteers
Rehabilitation and Implementation of Punishment
Crime prevention
Terrorism prevention

Legal Framework
The Federal Constitution allows Parliament to make laws related to internal security that include:
police; criminal investigation; registration of criminals; public order;
fire and rescue; fire safety; inflammable substances; pyrotechinques
 civil defence; emergency management; emergency preparedness
immigration services; passports; visas
prisons; reformatories; remand homes; places of detention; probation of offenders; juvenile offenders;
preventive detention; restriction of residence;
maritime security; maritime search and rescue
disaster management; disaster preparedness; disaster relief
 border security; anti smuggling
intelligence services; and
national registration.

See also

 Minister of Home Affairs (Malaysia)

References

External links

 
 

 
Federal ministries, departments and agencies of Malaysia
Law enforcement in Malaysia
Malaysia
Malaysia
Malaysia
Ministries established in 2008
2008 establishments in Malaysia